Tuen Mun is an MTR station in Tuen Mun, New Territories, Hong Kong. The station is elevated over the Tuen Mun River, near the Town Park in the centre of Tuen Mun New Town. The first train to Wu Kai Sha departs at 5:45 a.m., and the last train departs at 12:15 a.m. the day after.

It is an interchange station with the  Tuen Mun stop and Ho Tin stop. A public transport interchange adjacent to the station gives passengers direct access to the station concourse via escalators and stairs.

History
Tuen Mun station is adjacent to the former site of San Fat Estate, the first public housing estate in Tuen Mun, which was demolished in 2001 because of its age, and to provide a construction site for the station.

There is a plaque in the station concourse commemorating the topping out of the station. It was unveiled by the then-Chairman and Chief Executive of KCR Corporation, K.Y. Yeung, on 14 November 2001. The station opened with the rest of the West Rail on 20 December 2003.

Three new station entrances were opened on 1 August 2013. Exits C3, D, and E opened to provide direct access from the station concourse to the newly opened "V City" shopping centre.

Hence, Tuen Mun was included in the project and is now the western terminus of the Tuen Ma line.

Station layout

Platforms 1 and 2 share the same island platform. Passengers can catch eastbound Tuen Ma line trains on either platform.

Entrances/exits
 A: Pui To Road
 B: Light Rail - Tuen Mun 
 C1: Pui To Road 
 C2: Public Transport Interchange 
 D, E: Century Gateway, V City
 F1: Taxi Stand 
 F2: Light Rail - Ho Tin

References

External links

MTR stations in the New Territories
Tuen Ma line
West Rail line
Former Kowloon–Canton Railway stations
Tuen Mun District
Railway stations in Hong Kong opened in 2003